Aurigo Software is a global software company that provides cloud-based capital program software solution and project portfolio management cloud software for large capital infrastructure owners in public and private sector industries. The company is headquartered in Austin, Texas, and has offices in Mississauga and Bangalore.

Aurigo is known for its multiyear cloud software subscription agreements with public sector infrastructure owners, including federal and state Departments of Transportation (DOTs) and other large and midsize government agencies, to plan and deliver their capital infrastructure programs. Aurigo's customers include the Federal Highway Administration, local agencies such as City of Houston, City of Las Vegas, City of Lincoln, City of Pearland, King County, Portland Water Bureau and Tampa Bay Water, and several state transport departments such as Ministry of Transportation of Ontario, IowaDOT, MassDOT, and UDOT.

Background
Aurigo Software was established in January 2003 by Balaji Sreenivasan, an alumnus of the National Institute of Technology (NIT) in Tiruchirappalli, India, and the University of Florida, Gainesville. The company was named after the constellation, Auriga. Aurigo's current chairman, Ravi Gulati, is an alumnus of IIT Kharagpur and Carnegie Mellon University. He became director of Aurigo in December 2005 and has been chairman since 2006.

In 2007, Aurigo entered into an agreement with the Oregon Bridge Delivery Partners (OBDP), who have been using its capital project management application to automate the Oregon Department of Transportation's (ODOT) $2.5 billion OTIA III State Bridge Delivery Program. The City of Lincoln, Nebraska, began working with Aurigo in 2007.

In August 2013, Aurigo moved its headquarters from New York City to Austin, Texas. Three months later, it was reported that the company had attracted an additional funding of $6.3 million. In June 2014, Aurigo entered into a seven-year deal with Ontario's ministry of transportation. In January 2015, the company announced that it had reached a three-year agreement with Canadian energy company TransCanada, to use Aurigo's software in its pipeline projects. Another agreement was made with UDOT to provide project control software the same month. 
The following month, Aurigo announced that it had entered into a five-year multimillion-dollar agreement with the Port of Portland for its capital project management. In March, Aurigo entered into a five-year deal with Tampa Bay Water, taking responsibility for their project management system, which prior to the deal had been self-managed. In June, the company entered into an agreement with Colorado Department of Transportation, followed by a three-year deal with the City of Houston's General Services Department in August 2015.

In January 2016, Aurigo was awarded the Wisconsin Department of Transportation's management software project portfolio. In August, Aurigo entered into an agreement with the Massachusetts Department of Transportation. In November, Aurigo made agreements with the City of Las Vegas, Nevada, and the Regional Municipality of York, Ontario, Canada. Aurigo also has agreements with Pinellas County, Florida.

In early 2019, Aurigo began working on multiyear contracts with the DOTs of Nevada and Iowa. Subsequently, San Bernardino County, California, Houston Public Works, and City of Durham, North Carolina selected Aurigo to manage their infrastructure project processes.

In April 2020, Aurigo and Autodesk announced a product integration partnership, as part of which Autodesk acquired a minority stake in Aurigo. In May 2020, Aurigo announced that it has signed a multiyear contract with the City of Seattle to automate its contract management processes.

In February 2021, Ontario's ministry of transportation extended its contract with Aurigo by two years. In the following month, Aurigo entered into a multiyear deal with the New Jersey Turnpike Authority. This was followed by capital program management contracts with the City and County of Denver, City of Plano, Texas, Multnomah County, Oregon, and the water utilities department of Oklahoma City. In June 2022, Aurigo announced that it has entered into contracts with the cities of Colorado Springs, Colorado, St. Petersburg, Florida, and Pearland, Texas to manage their capital improvement programs.

Products and services 
According to the Austin Business Journal, Aurigo "develops a suite of business automation tools for capital planning, property management, capital project management, and collaboration and document management." It provides a management solution for ports, roads, bridges, pipelines, water utilities, oil and gas refineries, ports, and buildings, and also operates in business automation and business workflow engines. The company's clients are principally public agencies. As of 2014, it had some 50 clients, many of which are city and state departments in the US and Canada.

Aurigo Masterworks
Aurigo Masterworks is a cloud-based enterprise Capital Project Management Solution (CPMS), a software system that automates capital planning and program management processes to help capital infrastructure program owners plan and deliver mid-sized to large capital programs.  According to Engineering.com, "In addition to capital management and project management, Aurigo Masterworks also offers full life cycle construction management, safety and quality maintenance, and business operations support."

The Aurigo Masterworks suite is equipped with a business automation platform that includes an in-built Drag-N-Drop Forms Designer, Reporting Engine, and Business Workflow Configurator. Aurigo's product suite also includes a native mobile application that supports iOS, Android, and Windows Mobile. It is compatible with ERP platforms such as SAP, Microsoft Dynamics AX, and Oracle.

Aurigo Essentials
Aurigo Essentials is a cloud-based construction project management platform for small and mid-sized public sector agencies. It was first launched in 2019.

Aurigo Enterprise
Aurigo Enterprise is a cloud-based portfolio planning and construction project management platform for commercial builders, school districts, universities, hospitals, and healthcare systems.

Aurigo Engage
Launched in 2022, Aurigo Engage is a cloud-based, artificial intelligence-enabled platform which allows public agencies to collect and incorporate public feedback.

Business model
Aurigo functions on a Software as a Service (SaaS) model wherein the customer is charged for each product bought in the Aurigo Masterworks Cloud suite. The customer can then access Aurigo's software over the cloud.

Compliance
In 2020, Aurigo was designated with the FedRAMP Ready status, a security clearance to work with federal government agencies; it also received the ISO 22301:2019 business continuity management system certification. Aurigo Masterworks Cloud and Aurigo Essentials are part of the StateRAMP authorized product list. Aurigo is SSAE 18 SOC 2 Type 2 certified and its security configurations are NIST 800-53 (Rev 4) baseline compliant.

See also 

 Capital budgeting
 Construction management
 Project portfolio management

References

External links
Official site

Software companies based in Texas
Software companies established in 2003
Construction organizations
Project management software
Companies based in Austin, Texas
2003 establishments in New York City
Software companies of the United States
Companies established in 2003
Construction documents